Victor Chauvin (1844–1913), an Arabic and Hebrew professor at the University of Liège, wrote a number of notable books on Middle Eastern literature and folklore, orientalism, biblical history, and Sharia, including L`histoire de l`Islamisme and Bibliographie des Ouvrages Arabes Ou Relatifs Aux Arabes Publies Dans L'Europe Chretienne De 1810 a 1885.

References

Belgian non-fiction writers
Belgian male writers
Academic staff of the University of Liège
1844 births
1913 deaths
Male non-fiction writers